Regina Joyce (born February 7, 1957) is a retired female long-distance runner originally from Ireland. She competed at the 1984 Olympic Games in Los Angeles, finishing 23rd in the marathon. Her younger sister Monica also competed in the 1984 Olympics in the 3000 metres. Joyce competed as an NCAA athlete in the U.S. for the University of Washington, where she set school records in every event from 1500m to 10 km. She set her personal best in the marathon with 2:32.56 in Scottsdale 1982.

Joyce became an American citizen in 1993, and continues to run in the Masters division.

Achievements

References

 sports-reference

1957 births
Living people
Irish female long-distance runners
World Athletics Championships athletes for Ireland
Olympic athletes of Ireland
Athletes (track and field) at the 1984 Summer Olympics
Washington Huskies women's track and field athletes